This is a list of the federal highways in Brazil. The current numbering system has existed since 1964, with changes in 1973.

Brazilian federal road names are composed of the ISO 3166 code "BR", a dash and three numbers. State highways in the country are classified as YY-XXX, where YY is the abbreviation of the state where the highway is located and XXX is a number. The first digit in the number determines which of the five categories the National Road System divides it into.

Radial highways 
BR-0X0 – starts at the DF-001 in the Federal District and head towards the extremes of the country. Radial highways are identified by the first digit "0", and the other two vary between 10 and 90, always in multiples of ten, each one heading in a different direction clockwise from the DF-001. The direction of the distance starts from the DF-001, with the kilometre zero of each state being at the point of the highway closest to the federal capital. There are nine federal radial highways, including the BR-090, which has not yet been completed.

North-south highways 
BR-1XX – crosses the country in a north–south direction. Distance is measured in this direction, except for the BR-156, BR-163 and BR-174, which have the distance direction from south to north. The numbering ranges from 00 to 50 on the stretch from the far east of the country to Brasilia, and varies from 50 to 99 between the capital and the far west.

East-west highways 
BR-2XX – crosses the country in an east–west direction. The distance of these highways is always measured in this direction. The numbering ranges from 00 to 50 in the section that goes from the extreme north of the country to Brasilia, and from 50 to 99 between the capital and the extreme south.

Diagonal highways 
BR-3XX – crosses the country in two ways: northwest-southeast or northeast–southwest. The numbering can vary from 01 to 99.

Link highways 
BR-4XX – connects federal highways to nearby towns, other highways, or international borders, or that cannot be classified in any of the other types. There are also a few short highways beginning with BR-6XX, such as the BR-600.

References

Federal highways in Brazil